Turbo crassus, common name the crass turban, is a species of sea snail, a marine gastropod mollusk in the family Turbinidae, the turban snails.

Description
The size of the shell varies between 50 mm and 80 mm. The large, heavy, solid, imperforate shell has an ovate-conic shape. Its color pattern is dirty white, or greenish, maculated with angular, alternating blackish or brown and light patches on the broad flat spiral ribs. The interstices are narrow, superficial, and whitish. The six whorls are, convex, more or less prominently shouldered above. The ribs are obsolete around the axis. The aperture is white within and measures over half the length of shell. It is ovate, angled posteriorly and at position of the carina.  Its margin is more or less green tinged, not fluted. The columella is thickened and effuse at its base, callous posteriorly.

The operculum is subcircular, concave internally, with a nucleus one-third the distance across face. Its outer surface is very convex, the center dark-brown, coarsely granulose, lighter toward the outer margin and more minutely granulate. The margin of increment is white.

Distribution
This marine species occurs in the Western Pacific and Polynesia; off Australia (Queensland).

Notes
Additional information regarding this species:
 Taxonomic status: Some authors place the name in the subgenus Turbo (Marmarostoma)

References

 Wood, W. 1828. Index Testaceologicus; or A Catalogue of Shells, British and Foreign, arranged according to the Linnean system. London : Taylor Supplement, 1-59, pls 1-8
 Ladd, H.S. 1966. Chitons and gastropods (Haliotidae through Adeorbidae) from the western Pacific Islands. United States Geological Survey Professional Papers 531: 1-98 16 pls
 Wilson, B. 1993. Australian Marine Shells. Prosobranch Gastropods. Kallaroo, Western Australia : Odyssey Publishing Vol. 1 408 pp.
 Alf A. & Kreipl K. (2003). A Conchological Iconography: The Family Turbinidae, Subfamily Turbininae, Genus Turbo. Conchbooks, Hackenheim Germany.

External links
 To Encyclopedia of Life
 To USNM Invertebrate Zoology Mollusca Collection
 To World Register of Marine Species
 

crassus
Gastropods described in 1828